Superb may refer to:

Škoda Superb car
, nine Royal Navy ships
The Superb, a railroad car used by US President Warren G. Harding 
SuperB, a proposed particle physics facility in Italy
Grevillea 'Superb', a widely grown grevillea (shrub) cultivar
Superb, subsidiary of Hybe Corporation

See also
Superbe (disambiguation)